Mark Yoffe Liberman  is an American linguist.  He has a dual appointment at the University of Pennsylvania, as Trustee Professor of Phonetics in the Department of Linguistics, and as a professor in the Department of Computer and Information Sciences. He is the founder and director of the Linguistic Data Consortium.   Liberman is the Faculty Director of Ware College House at the University of Pennsylvania.

Early life 
Liberman is the son of psychologists Alvin Liberman and Isabelle Liberman.

Mark Liberman attended Harvard College but did not graduate. After two years' service in the US Army in Vietnam, he enrolled in graduate school in linguistics at MIT, from which he received a Master of Science (1972) and a PhD (1975).

Career
From 1975 to 1990, he was a Member of Technical Staff at Bell Laboratories.

Research 
Liberman's main research interests lie in phonetics, prosody, and other aspects of speech communication. His early research established the linguistic subfield of metrical phonology. Much of his current research is conducted through computational analyses of linguistic corpora. In 2017, Liberman was the recipient of the IEEE James L. Flanagan Speech and Audio Processing Award.

Liberman is a founding co-editor of the Annual Review of Linguistics. 
Liberman is also the founder of (and frequent contributor to) Language Log, a blog with a broad cast of dozens of professional linguists. The concept of the eggcorn was first proposed in one of his posts there.

Mobile phones and endangered languages 
In 2012, Liberman and Steven Bird began a US$101,501 project "to use mobile telephones to collect larger amounts of data on undocumented endangered languages than would ever be possible through usual fieldwork." The project resulted in the mobile app Aikuma.

Books

References

External links

 
 Mark Liberman at Ware College House, UPenn

Year of birth missing (living people)
Living people
Phoneticians
Linguists from the United States
Harvard College alumni
University of Pennsylvania faculty
MIT School of Humanities, Arts, and Social Sciences alumni
American bloggers
Scientists at Bell Labs
Endangered languages
Annual Reviews (publisher) editors
Christopher H. Browne Distinguished Professor
Fellows of the Linguistic Society of America